Merle Anthony Tuve (June 27, 1901 – May 20, 1982) was an American geophysicist who was the Chairman of the Office of Scientific Research and Development's Section T, which was created in August 1940. He was founding director of the Johns Hopkins University Applied Physics Laboratory, the main laboratory of Section T during the war from 1942 onward.  He was a pioneer in the use of pulsed radio waves whose discoveries opened the way to the development of radar and nuclear energy.

Background
Merle Antony Tuve was born in Canton, South Dakota. He and physicist Ernest Lawrence were childhood friends. All four of his grandparents were born in Norway and subsequently immigrated to the United States. His father, Anthony G. Tuve, was president of Augustana College and his mother, Ida Marie Larsen Tuve, taught music there. After Tuve's father died in the influenza epidemic of 1918, the family moved to Minneapolis, where Merle attended the University of Minnesota; he received there a BS degree in 1922 and an MS degree in 1923 both in Physics. Following a year at Princeton where he was an instructor, Tuve subsequently went to work for his doctorate at Johns Hopkins University. He obtained there his PhD degree in physics in 1927.

Career
In 1925, with physicist Gregory Breit, Tuve used radio waves to measure the height of the ionosphere and probe its interior layers. The observations he made provided the theoretical foundation for the development of radar. He was among the first physicists to use high-voltage accelerators to define the structure of the atom. In 1933 he confirmed the existence of the neutron and was also able to measure the binding forces in atomic nuclei.

Tuve proposed that an electronically activated proximity fuze would make anti-aircraft fire far more effective, and led the team of scientists that developed the device, which proved crucial in the allies' victory in World War II. He led in the development of the proximity fuze first at the Department of Terrestrial Magnetism and then later at the Johns Hopkins University Applied Physics Laboratory and also made contributions to experimental seismology, radio astronomy, and optical astronomy.

In 1942, Merle Tuve was the founding director of the Johns Hopkins University Applied Physics Laboratory. Merle Tuve was the Director of Terrestrial Magnetism Research at the Carnegie Institution for Science (1946–66). He served on the first U.S. National Commission for UNESCO, on the National Research Council Committee on Growth, and on the U.S. Committee for the International Geophysical Year. He was the first chairman of the Geophysical Research Board of the National Academy of Sciences and home secretary of the National Academy of Sciences.

Personal life
Merle Tuve had two brothers: George Lewis Tuve, who was a professor of mechanical engineering and Richard Larsen Tuve, who was an inventor and chemist. Their sister, Rosemond Tuve was an author and professor of Renaissance Literature at Connecticut College. Merle Tuve was married in 1927 to Winifred Gray Whitman. Merle and Winifred had two children, Trygve and Lucy. Both earned Ph.D. degrees and pursued scientific careers.

Honors
For his service to the nation during  World War II, Tuve received the Presidential Medal for Merit from President Harry S. Truman and was named an Honorary Commander of the Order of the British Empire in 1948. Mount Tuve in Ellsworth Land in Antarctica was named in honor of Merle Anthony Tuve. The Library of Congress holds his papers in more than 400 archival boxes.

Awards
William Bowie Medal awarded by the American Geophysical Union
Howard N. Potts Medal presented by the Franklin Institute of Philadelphia, Pennsylvania
Comstock Prize in Physics awarded by the National Academy of Sciences (1948)
Order of the Condor of the Andes issued by the nation of Bolivia
Cosmos Club Award  issued by the Cosmos Club
John Scott Award issued by the City of Philadelphia

Selected works
Velocity structures in Hydrogen Profiles: A sky atlas of neutral hydrogen emission  (1973)
The Third Cosmos Club Award: Merle A. Tuve (1966)
The Forces Which Govern the Atomic Nucleus  (1938)

References

Related reading
Tuve, George Lewis  The Tuve-Tuff-Tew brothers: Five Norwegian immigrants and their families (Tuve. 1977)
Evans, Margaret Rosemond Tuve. A Life of The Mind (Peter E. Randall Publisher. 2004)

External links
Oral History Transcript — Dr. Merle Tuve
Dr. Merle A. Tuve  The Scientific Monthly, February 1931

1901 births
1982 deaths
American people of Norwegian descent
People from Canton, South Dakota
University of Minnesota College of Science and Engineering alumni
American geophysicists
Howard N. Potts Medal recipients
Fellows of the American Physical Society